Hwawangsan (Hanja: 火旺山) or Hwawang, is a mountain in Changnyeong County of South Gyeongsang Province, southeastern South Korea. It has an elevation of 757 metres.

Etymology

The name originated from the fire festival and practice of burning dry weeds and rice fields that took place every year on January 15.

Overview
It is one of the three primary tourist locations in Changnyeong County. On January 11, 1984, it was designated as a national park.

See also
List of mountains of Korea
Changnyeong Town

References

Mountains of South Gyeongsang Province
Changnyeong County
Mountains of South Korea